Chinese Journal may refer to

Chinese Medical Journal
Chinese Journal of Physics
Chinese Journal of International Law